Canjica is a white variety of corn typical of Brazilian cuisine. It is mostly used in a special kind of sweet popcorn and in a sweet dish also named "canjica", a popular Festa Junina dish.

See also 
 List of Brazilian dishes
 List of Brazilian sweets and desserts

References

External links
 Canjica recipe from a site in Portuguese.

Brazilian cuisine
Cereals